Jonathan Ray Banks (born January 31, 1947) is an American actor. Born in Washington, D.C. and raised in Chillum Heights, Maryland, Banks did theatre while attending Indiana University Bloomington. In 1974, he moved to Los Angeles where he began playing supporting roles in films and television. His breakthrough came with the role of FBI Special Agent Frank McPike in the television series Wiseguy (1987–1990). For his role, at the Emmy Awards he was nominated for "Outstanding Supporting Actor in a Drama Series".  

From there on, Banks continued acting in films and television. In 2009, Banks received critical acclaim for his role as hitman and fixer Mike Ehrmantraut in the television series Breaking Bad (2009–2012), its spin-off series Better Call Saul (2015–2022), and its sequel film, El Camino: A Breaking Bad Movie (2019). For this role, he has received Primetime Emmy Award nominations for Outstanding Supporting Actor in a Drama Series (2013, 2015–2017, 2019) for his work on all three series, making him the only actor with nominations as a main cast member for three shows in this category, two of which feature him as the same character.  

Banks' film projects include Sidney Poitier's Stir Crazy (1980), Zucker, Abrahams and Zucker's Airplane! (1980), Walter Hill's 48 Hrs. (1982), Martin Brest's Beverly Hills Cop (1984), Geoff Murphy's Freejack (1991), Simon Wincer's Crocodile Dundee in Los Angeles (2001), Mike Binder's Reign Over Me (2007), Dee Rees's Mudbound (2017), and Jaume Collet-Serra's The Commuter (2018). He also had appearances on television in The Gangster Chronicles (1981), Otherworld (1985), Highlander: The Series (1994), Walker, Texas Ranger (1994), CSI: Crime Scene Investigation (2004), Without a Trace (2006), Community (2014), etc. He has also been a voice actor, including in video games.

Early life and education
Jonathan Ray Banks was born on January 31, 1947, in Washington, D.C., and grew up in Chillum Heights, Maryland.  His father was a civil servant and his mother a professor at Indiana State University. Banks said his late mother was a secretary in various federal government offices, including the CIA, and that she was also a private secretary to several top Naval officers, including Admiral Chester Nimitz.

Banks graduated from Northwood High School in Silver Spring, and attended Indiana University Bloomington, where he was a classmate of actor Kevin Kline. During that time, they participated in a production of The Threepenny Opera together. After graduating, he joined a touring company of Hair as a stage manager, and traveled to Australia and New Zealand.

Career

1974–1990: Early work and recognition
In 1974, Banks moved to Los Angeles, where he worked in theater before picking up bit parts. Also in 1974, Banks acted in the public service announcement (PSA) Linda's Film on Menstruation.

His early film appearances include Who'll Stop the Rain (1978), The Cheap Detective (1978), Coming Home (1978), and The Rose (1979).

During the late 1970s and early 1980s, he appeared in television films such as The Girl in the Empty Grave (1977), Alexander: The Other Side of Dawn, The Ordeal of Patty Hearst (1979), She's Dressed to Kill (1979), Rage (1980), Desperate Voyage (1980).

From 1980 to 1990, Banks acted in the films Stir Crazy (1980), Airplane! (1980), 48 Hrs. (1982), Frances (1982), Beverly Hills Cop (1984), Gremlins (1984), Buckaroo Banzai (1984), Armed and Dangerous (1986), Cold Steel (1987), and Honeymoon Academy (1990).

His television-roles of the 1980s include the NBC series the Gangster Chronicles (1981), where he played Dutch Schultz, and the short-lived science fiction series Otherworld (1985), where he portrayed the main antagonist.

Banks achieved a career breakthrough with the role of Frank McPike in the television series Wiseguy, which he starred in from 1987 to 1990. His performance led to a Primetime Emmy Award nomination, for "Outstanding Supporting Actor in a Drama Series". Although his character was primarily the hero's mentor and superior officer, stories occasionally featured McPike as hero.

1991–2008: Subsequent roles

Banks' films in the 1990s include Freejack (1991), Boiling Point (1993), Under Siege 2: Dark Territory (1995), Flipper (1996), Dark Breed (1996), Last Man Standing (1996), A Thousand Men and a Baby (1997), Melanie Darrow (1997), Harvey (1999), Millennium Man (1999), Foolish (1999), Let the Devil Wear Black (1999), Thrash (1999), and Outlaw Justice (1999).

He also acted in television films such as Body Shot (1993) and Shadow of Obsession (1995).

In 1994, Banks had guest appearances in the television shows Matlock, Highlander: The Series, Walker, Texas Ranger, and Tales from the Crypt.

In 1996, Banks reprised the role of Frank McPike in the television film Wiseguy.

His films in the 2000s include Crocodile Dundee in Los Angeles (2001), Face to Face (2001), Downward Angel (2001), Dark Blue (2003), Jam (2007), Reign Over Me (2007), and Proud American (2008).

In 2004, he acted in one episode of CSI: Crime Scene Investigation.

In 2006, he acted in an episodes of Without a Trace.

According to voice actor Nolan North, Banks was originally considered to play the role of Zoran Lazaravić in the 2009 video game Uncharted 2: Among Thieves, but the role went to Graham McTavish.

2009–present: Breaking Bad, Better Call Saul, and other work 
In 2009, Banks began starring as Mike Ehrmantraut in the second season of Breaking Bad. He became a series regular for the third, fourth, and fifth seasons. For his performance, he received a Primetime Emmy Award nomination for Outstanding Supporting Actor in a Drama Series at the 2013 ceremony. In 2015, he reprised his role as Mike Ehrmantraut as a member of the main cast in the Breaking Bad spinoff Better Call Saul. At the Emmy Awards, he was nominated for Outstanding Supporting Actor in a Drama Series at their 2015, 2016, 2017, and 2019 ceremonies.

His films in the 2010s include Identity Thief (2013), Bullet (2014), Horrible Bosses 2 (2014), Term Life (2016), The Commuter (2018), and Incredibles 2 (2018).

Banks had a recurring role as Buzz Hickey in the fifth season of the NBC sitcom Community.

In 2015, he voiced James Gordon in the video game Batman: Arkham Knight, and was a guest on the MythBusters episode "Supernatural Shooters".

Banks portrayed the main antagonist in the 2017 film Mudbound. With his costars, he was nominated for Outstanding Performance by a Cast in a Motion Picture at the Screen Actors Guild Awards.

In 2020, Banks joined the cast of the Netflix animated series F Is for Family in its fourth season as Bill Murphy, father of the main character.

Personal life

Banks married his first wife, Marnie Fausch, in 1968. They had one daughter before divorcing in 1970. Banks married his second wife, Gennera Gonzalez Cebian, in 1990. They had fraternal twins, and Banks has a stepdaughter from this marriage.

Banks was awarded an honorary doctoral degree from Indiana University in April 2016.

Banks's home was destroyed in the 2018 Woolsey Fire.

Filmography

Awards and nominations

References

External links 

 
 

1947 births
Living people
20th-century American male actors
21st-century American male actors
American male film actors
American male television actors
American male voice actors
Male actors from Washington, D.C.
People from Silver Spring, Maryland